Fort Hamilton Parkway is a parkway in Brooklyn, New York. It runs for 4.1 miles from the neighborhood of Windsor Terrace to Bay Ridge, its southern end at the entrance to its namesake military base at Fort Hamilton.

History
Originally known as Fort Hamilton Avenue, it was renamed by the state legislature as a parkway in 1892, along with Bay Ridge Parkway, and Bay Parkway, placing the road under the jurisdiction of the Brooklyn Parks Department. The renaming was intended to boost the desirability of real estate along its route. The renaming was approved by the governor on May 17, 1892. In contrast to Ocean Parkway and Eastern Parkway, while Fort Hamilton Parkway was paved in late 1896, it was never given the widths or separated lanes of these two better-known Brooklyn parkways. In 1915, responsibility for this road was transferred from Parks to the Brooklyn Borough President. Fort Hamilton Parkway is presently maintained by the New York City Department of Transportation, which maintains all  streets in New York City.

Parks along the route

As Fort Hamilton Parkway cuts diagonally through the local street grid, triangular intersections that are too small to be developed were designated as parks, including Bocchino-Dente Memorial Plaza and Lt. William E. Coffey Square. Other parks along its route include Greenwood Playground, Leif Ericson Park, McKinley Park, Kathy Reilly Triangle, Dan Ross Playground, and John J. Carty Park. Fort Hamilton Parkway is also the southeastern border of Green-Wood Cemetery, whose Fort Hamilton gate contains a landmarked cottage building.

Transportation
Until 1975, there was another station also called Fort Hamilton Parkway on the now-demolished section of the BMT Culver Line. The B16 bus route follows Fort Hamilton Parkway between 86th and 56th Streets, while the B70 bus follows it between Seventh Avenue and 92nd Street in Bay Ridge.

References

External links
 

Streets in Brooklyn